Quail Mountain, at , is the highest mountain in Joshua Tree National Park and the highest point in the Little San Bernardino Mountains of the very southern reach of the Mojave Desert.  It is one of the southernmost peaks in the Transverse Ranges, with the Peninsular Ranges just across the Colorado Desert and Coachella Valley.

Trails
The mountain can be reached by foot from almost any direction. The regular route utilizes the California Riding and Hiking Trail starting from Keys View road and traverses barren, burned desert  to Juniper Flats. From there it is about  more of cross-country hiking to the flat summit which is marked by a large cairn. There are no trails to the summit, all routes involve cross-country hiking.

The best times to hike the peak are Fall, Winter and Spring. Winter can be very cold and windy, and summer is very hot and not recommended. Fall (October–December) is probably the safest time to visit the peak. Watch for rattlesnakes in the spring. There is no water or shade en route.

Natural history

Flora
Quail Mountain was previously covered with old-growth California juniper (Juniperus californica) and Single-leaf Pinyon (Pinus monophylla), Joshua tree (Yucca brevifolia), and Coastal sage scrub oak (Quercus dumosa) woodland. Several wildfires burned over the mountain, leaving it very barren of taller woody plants, which continues while their slow natural regeneration occurs. There are occasional Pinyon pines and California junipers that survived, and they are the source for new generation.

Fauna
A few Desert Bighorn Sheep live in the Little San Bernardino Mountains, and seeing one or a herd is a rewarding experience.

Event history
The devastating fire on Quail Mountain in 1999 unfortunately occurred again only 2 years later in 2001, and both burned over the mountain leaving it very barren of higher vegetation.

On the mountain a few pieces of aircraft wreckage can still be found. On February 4, 1999, two civilian T-28's (N628B and N128BJ) piloted by Bill Jones and Greg Weber crashed into the side of the mountain killing both pilots. They were en route to Thermal Airport from Van Nuys Airport as a flight of two and impacted at the  level on the west side of the mountain. At the time of the accident, the Little San Bernardino Mountains were obscured by cloud cover.

See also
 California montane chaparral and woodlands
 Deserts and xeric shrublands
 Desert ecology
 Joshua Tree National Park

References

External links
 Joshua Tree National Park (U.S. National Park Service) website
 Joshua Tree National Park: Nature & Science website

Joshua Tree National Park
Mountains of Riverside County, California
Protected areas of Riverside County, California
Protected areas of the Mojave Desert
Protected areas of the Colorado Desert
Mountains of Southern California
Highest points of United States national parks